Suchitra Sen (born as Roma Dasgupta (6 April 1931 – 17 January 2014) was an Indian actress who worked in Bengali and Hindi cinema. The movies in which she was paired opposite Uttam Kumar became classics in the history of Bengali cinema.

Sen was the first Indian actress to receive an award at an international film festival when, at the 1963 Moscow International Film Festival, she won the Silver Prize for Best Actress for Saat Pake Bandha. In 1972, she was awarded the Padma Shri, the fourth highest civilian award in India. From 1979 on, she retreated from public life and shunned all forms of public contact; for this she is often compared to Greta Garbo. In 2005, she refused the Dadasaheb Phalke Award, the highest cinematic award in India, to stay out of the public eye. In 2012, she was conferred the West Bengal Government's highest honour: Banga Bibhushan. Her first official release was Sukumar Dasgupta's Saat Number Kayedi (1953). She was catapulted to stardom after she was cast as Vishnupriya by Devaki Kumar Bose in his Bhagaban Shree Krishna Chaitanya (1953).

Personal life and education

Suchitra Sen was born on 6 April 1931, in a Bengali Baidya-brahmin family of Bhanga Bari village of Belkuchi Upazila, now in Sirajganj District. Her father, Korunamoy Dasgupta was a headmaster in a local school in Pabna. Her mother, Indira Devi was a homemaker. Sen was their fifth child and second daughter. She was a granddaughter of the poet Rajonikant Sen. She received her formal education in Pabna Government Girls High School. The violence of Partition in 1947 brought her family to West Bengal, which was comparably a safe zone for Hindus. Here she married Dibanath Sen, son of wealthy industrialist Adinath Sen, in 1947, at the age of 15 years. She had one daughter, Moon Moon Sen, who is a former actress. Suchitra's father-in-law, Adinath Sen, was supportive of her acting career in films after her marriage. Her industrialist husband invested greatly in her career and supported her.

Sen had made a successful entry into Bengali films in 1952, and then a less successful transition into the Hindi movie industry. According to persistent but unconfirmed reports in the Bengali press, her marriage was strained by her success in the film industry.

Career
Suchitra Sen made her debut in films with Shesh Kothaay in 1952, but it was never released. The following year saw her act opposite Uttam Kumar in Sharey Chuattor, a film by Nirmal Dey. It was a box-office hit and is remembered for launching Uttam-Suchitra as a leading pair. They went on to become the icons for Bengali dramas for more than 20 years, becoming almost a genre unto themselves. She has acted in 30 of her 60 films with Uttam Kumar. She received a Best Actress Award nomination for the film Devdas (1955), which was her first Hindi movie. Her Bengali melodramas and romances, especially with Uttam Kumar, made her the most famous Bengali actress ever.

Her films ran through the 1960s and '70s. Her husband died in 1970 in Baltimore, Maryland, USA. Suchitra went on to act in films such as in the Hindi film Aandhi (1974). Aandhi was inspired by India's Prime Minister Indira Gandhi. Sen received a Filmfare Award nomination as Best Actress, while Sanjeev Kumar, who played the role of her husband, won the Filmfare as Best Actor.

One of her best known performances was in Deep Jwele Jaai (1959). She played in a character named Radha Mitra, a hospital nurse employed by a progressive psychiatrist, Pahadi Sanyal, who is expected to develop a personal relationship with male patients as part of their therapy. Sanyal diagnoses the hero, Basanta Choudhury, as having an unresolved Oedipal dilemma. He orders Radha to play the role though she is hesitant as in a similar case she had fallen in love with the patient. She finally agrees and bears up to Choudhury's violence, impersonates his mother, sings his poetic compositions and in the process falls in love again. In the end, even as she brings about his cure, she suffers a nervous breakdown. The film is noted for its partly lit close-ups of Sen, which set the tone of the film. Asit Sen remade the film in Hindi as Khamoshi (1969), with Waheeda Rehman in the Suchitra Sen role.

Suchitra Sen's other landmark film with Asit Sen was Uttar Falguni (1963). She plays the dual role of a courtesan, Pannabai, and her daughter Suparna, a lawyer. Critics note that she brought a great deal of poise, grace and dignity to the role of a fallen woman determined to see her daughter grow up in a good, clean environment.

Suchitra Sen's international success came in 1963, when she won the best actress award at the Moscow International Film Festival for the movie Saat Paake Bandha, becoming the first Indian actress to receive an international film award. 

A film critic summed up Suchitra Sen's career and continuing legacy as "one half of one of Indian cinema's most popular and abiding screen pairs, Suchitra Sen redefined stardom in a way that few actors have done, combining understated sensuality, feminine charm and emotive force and a no-nonsense gravitas to carve out a persona that has never been matched, let alone surpassed in Indian cinema".

In retirement

Suchitra Sen refused Satyajit Ray's offer due to a scheduling problem. As a result, Ray never made the film Devi Chaudhurani, based on the novel written by Rishi Bankim Chandra Chattopadhya. She also refused Raj Kapoor's offer for a film under the RK banner.

Sen continued to act after her husband's death in 1970, but called it a day when Pronoy Pasha flopped, and retired from the screen in 1978 after a career of over 25 years to a life of quiet seclusion. She was to do a film project; Nati Binodini, also starring Rajesh Khanna, but the film was shelved mid-way after shooting when she decided to quit acting.

She assiduously avoided the public gaze after her retirement and devoted her time to the Ramakrishna Mission.

Death

Suchitra Sen was admitted to the hospital on 24 December 2013 and was diagnosed with a lung infection. She was reported to have been recovering well in the first week of January. But her condition turned worse later and she died at 8.25 am on 17 January 2014, due to a heart attack. She was 82 years old.

Suchitra Sen's death was condoled by many leaders, including the President of India Pranab Mukherjee, the Prime Minister Dr. Manmohan Singh, the Prime Minister of Bangladesh, Sheikh Hasina, and BJP's Prime Ministerial candidate Narendra Modi. A gun salute was given before her cremation, upon the orders of Mamata Banerjee, the Chief Minister of West Bengal.

Respecting her fierce desire for complete privacy, her last rites were performed at Kolkata's Kaioratola crematorium, barely five and half hours after she died, with her coffin reaching the crematorium in a flower-decked hearse with dark-tinted windows. Despite being Bengal's greatest star, referred to as "Mahanayika", she had consciously chosen to step into oblivion and she remained an enigma till her last, although thousands of fans had converged at the crematorium to catch one last glimpse of their idol. Her entire medical treatment had also been done in seclusion and secrecy.

Filmography
From 1953 to 1978, both in Bengali and Hindi, Suchitra Sen acted in 61 films.

Awards

Sen received 10 awards during her lifetime. In 1963, she became the first Indian actress to receive an international award.
 1962 – Won BFJA Award for Best Actress for Saptapadi
 1964 – Won BFJA Award for Best Actress for Uttar Phalguni
 1973 – Won BFJA Award for Best Actress for Alo Amaar Alo
 1976 – Won BFJA Award for Best Actress (Hindi) for Aandhi
 1963 – Won 3rd Moscow International Film Festival for Best Actress for Saat Paake Badha
 1967 – Nominated Filmfare Award for Best Actress for Mamta
 1972 – Won Padma Shri for notable contribution in arts
 1975 – Won Filmfare Award for Best Actress for regional cinema Priya Bandhabi
 1976 – Nominated Filmfare Award for Best Actress for Aandhi
 2012 – Won Banga Bibhushan for lifetime achievement in film acting
 2014 – Won Filmfare East Lifetime Achievement Award (Posthumous)

References

External links

 
 
   
 Calcuttaweb article on Suchitra Sen

1931 births
2014 deaths
Bengali Hindus
Indian Hindus
20th-century Indian actresses
Indian film actresses
Indian voice actresses
Actresses in Hindi cinema
Actresses in Bengali cinema
People from Sirajganj District
Recipients of the Padma Shri in arts